Harland W. Braun (born September 21, 1942) is a Los Angeles, California criminal defense attorney.  His cases have included successfully defending John Landis and his co-defendant George Folsey Jr. in the Twilight Zone manslaughter trial, defending Rep. Bobbi Fiedler against bribery charges, successfully defending state criminal charges against one of the officers charged in the Rodney King beating who was convicted in the subsequent federal trial, and defending several officers in the Rampart scandal. Braun withdrew himself from representing Robert Blake at his murder trial when Blake gave a television interview against his advice. Other celebrity clients have included Roman Polanski, Roseanne Barr, Gary Busey, Chris Farley, Lane Garrison, and Dennis Rodman.

Braun attended UCLA and UCLA Law School, and worked in the district attorney's office before becoming a solo practitioner in 1973.

Braun is known for outspoken and flippant remarks in defense of his clients, such as calling the heavy boot an officer wore while kicking King a "ballet slipper."  "Any high-profile client is going to be tried in the press," Braun says. "You can only neutralize the prosecution in the press. To say you're not going to try it in the press is like saying you're not going to show up the first day of trial, because the trial starts the first day the prosecution starts leaking evidence."

References

External links
Law Offices of Harland Braun website

California lawyers
University of California, Los Angeles alumni
UCLA School of Law alumni
Living people
1942 births
Criminal defense lawyers